Thrippunithura Surinarayanan Mahadevan, popularly known as TS Mahadevan is an Indian cricketer, who played 19 first-class matches between 1979 and 1987 for Kerala. Mahadevan played as an off spinner and was the highest wicket taker for Kerala, in the 1985–86 Ranji Trophy season by picking up 18 wickets, with 8 for 108 as his best spell against Hyderabad.

References

External links
 

  
1957 births
Living people
Kerala cricketers
Indian cricketers
South Zone cricketers
People from Kochi
Cricketers from Kochi